Castelnau-d'Auzan (Gascon: Castèthnau d'Eusan) is a former commune in the Gers department in southwestern France. On 1 January 2016, it was merged into the new commune Castelnau-d'Auzan-Labarrère.

Geography
It benefits of a privileged situation on the fringe the Landes forest in the middle of an agreeable and fertile region. The village lies on the water parting between the Gélise and the Izaute and occupies the emplacement of an ancient castle.

The geographical situation is agreeable: the Atlantic coast on one side and on the other side the ski resorts of the south of France are by car only a distance of 145 km (2 h 15 min).

History
The name Castelnau d'Auzan means: "Château Neuf in the land of Éauzan". The castle disappeared, but here and there in the village some remains are still visible.

Sights
 Town hall.
 The arena for the course Landaise.
 Leisure area and its lake.
 Old Armagnac caves.
 Église Sainte Marie-Madeleine:
 In the centre of Castelnau, a neo Gothic church from the nineteenth century.
 Église Saint Jean de Béziey:
 A country side church from the eleventh century, well known by its miraculous source believed to cure illnesses of the eyes.
 Église Saint Martin d'Arèch:
 From the fifteenth century with a particular cylindrical bell-tower.
 Église de Rieupeyroux:
 A church in the countryside in the centre of Houeillères with a particular forged iron cross.
 Notre-Dame de Pibèque:
 A regional pilgrimage centre with a miraculous source. The splendid little church is a jewel and dates from the fifteenth century.

Population

The inhabitants are called Auzanais.

Like in other communes in rural France the canton had a decrease of population. In 1962, the canton had 5938 citizens. In 1999, there were only 4741, which represents a decrease of 20%. This decrease is still continuing.

This phenomenon started, as in many other rural areas during the War of 1914-1918. Many young men did not return home. Lack of manpower changed the once wealthy and healthy pastoral area in a region where the population and wealth both decreased.  New immigrants from Spain and Italy compensated partly the loss in population.

After the independence of Algeria, the French farmers and winemakers returning to France were encouraged to settle in the Gers.

All these waves of immigrants now are completely integrated.

Due to the changes in the rural economics the last decade agricultural land and farms were put on the market and sold to newcomers from the north of Europe, looking for an active countryside way of life.

Gradually immigration changed, nowadays retired people from the north European urban areas  come to the Gers in search of idyllic homes for their retirement.

Features
Castelnau-d'Auzan is surrounded by vineyards, smoothly undulating hills and here and there a nice little village. The setting and ambiance are perfect for promenades by foot or by bicycle, or a little play of golf on the splendid Golf de Guinlet, which is on five minutes distance of the village.

Because of its landscapes the Gers is now and then called the "Tuscany of France". The summers are long and warm; the winters are warm and short. In the neighborhood are numerous old castles, little medieval walled villages, small cities built around castles and "sacred" places, because the Way of St. James of Compostela and the Via Podiensis are going through the Gers and left their traces.

Close to the "place de la Mairie" with the pretty town hall you will find the oldest street of Castelnau the "rue du Canon". This spot survived everything, invasions, wars and whatever it dates from the fifteenth century.

Tourism and culture
Local associations develop numerous activities which make it possible to share the local passion for: the nature, good walking bicycling routes, traditional skittle and ball games quilles au maillet) and palet gascon; courses Landaises a daring and innocent game with wild cows; old fashioned battue hunting; local feasts; and gastronomy.

The leisure area offers during the summer holidays the children collective and individual games, trips in to the nature and theme days. The leisure area offers a wide range of amusement in a splendid green neighbourhood with swimming pool, children's pool and game zone, two tennis courts, a beach volleyball  court, a fitness circuit, a fishing lake of 3 hectares, pick-nick places and perfect walking and bicycle routes.

Castelnau d'Auzan is today a perfect place to be for a short or longer time. A lot of healthy occupations are possible, cultural and gastronomic trips and you simply can take a rest. The visit card of the region: a fine glass of Côtes de Gascogne, Saint-Mont or Madiran or if you like a Floc de Gascogne and a good conversation. With measure it also nice to consume a glass Armagnac, a good cassoulet, a typical confit de canard or a small piece of foie gras.

There are 2 campsites - the small, quiet Domaine Le Poteau which won French campsite of the year in 2021 and a municipal site.

Events
 Easter Monday: attic, antique and garage sale with course Landaise.
 The before last weekend of July:  local feasts with village dinners in the open air, attic sales and time-honoured skittle and ball games
 First weekend of August: feast in Arèch with open air dinner and ball and numerous attractions.
 Third weekend of August: feast in Houeillères with open air dinner and ball and numerous attractions.

Personalities
 Joseph Nicolas Barbeau Barran was a delegate in the National Convention and the Chambre des Cent Jours, born in Castelnau-d'Auzan in 1761, he  died in 1816 in Switzerland. At the trial of Louis XVI he voted guilty and for the death penalty. He was President of the Jacobin Club and an antagonist of Robespierre. At the second Restoration in 1816 he was, because of the assassination of the king, condemned to exile and he went to Switzerland.
 General Henri de Mibielle was born in Castelnau d'Auzan in 1841, died in 1910; his tomb is on the cemetery of Béziey.

Transportation
The village can easily be reached by car or train. Nearby rail stations are: Mont-de-Marsan (55 km - 1h00m), Agen (65 km - 1h05m) and Auch (70 km - 1h05m).

Three airports are in the neighbourhood: Toulouse (140 km - 2h10m), Bordeaux (150 km -1h50m) and Pau (100 km - 1h40m).

See also
Communes of the Gers department

References

External links

 Armagnac Baron de Sigognac
 Gulf of Guinlet

Castelnaudauzan
Populated places disestablished in 2016